This is the list of conglomerates in Kenya.

See also

 Conglomerates
 Africa conglomerates
 Uganda Conglomerates
 Wealthy Kenyans
 Kenya Economy

References

Conglomerate companies of Kenya
Conglomerates